Men's Combined World Cup 1994/1995

Calendar

Final point standings
In Men's Combined World Cup 1994/95 both results count.

Note:

In both races not all points were awarded (not enough finishers/competitors).

Men's Combined Team Results

bold indicate highest score - italics indicate race wins

World Cup
FIS Alpine Ski World Cup men's combined discipline titles